Jan Simensen (born 26 July 1944) is a former speedway rider from Sweden.

Speedway career 
Simensen rode in the top tier of British Speedway from 1970 until 1972, riding for Cradley Heathens, Coventry Bees and Wolverhampton Wolves.

He competed in the final of the Speedway World Championship in the 1972 Individual Speedway World Championship.

World Final appearances

Individual World Championship
 1972 -  London, Wembley Stadium - Reserve - 2pts

World Team Cup
 1972 -  Olching, Olching Speedwaybahn (with Tommy Jansson / Anders Michanek / Christer Lofqvist / Göte Nordin) 4th - 18pts (3)

References 

1944 births
Living people
Swedish speedway riders
Coventry Bees riders
Cradley Heathens riders
Wolverhampton Wolves riders